Sergeant Joseph M. Darby (born c. 1979) is a former U.S. Army Reservist known as the whistleblower in the Abu Ghraib torture and prisoner abuse scandal.  Darby is a graduate of North Star High School, near his hometown at the time, Jenners, Pennsylvania.

At the time, Darby served as an M.P. at the Abu Ghraib prison, in Abu Ghraib, Iraq. After learning of the abuse, Darby was the first person to take steps to alert the U.S. military command.

Disclosure of abuses at Abu Ghraib

In January 2004, Darby provided two CD-ROMs of photographs to Special Agent Tyler Pieron of the U.S. Army Criminal Investigation Command, who was stationed at Abu Ghraib Prison, triggering an investigation that led to the implication of several soldiers violating the Geneva Convention. Darby initially wanted to remain anonymous, and had been assured of anonymity — he and those implicated all served in the 372nd Military Police Company, but became known when The New Yorker published his name and when later Donald Rumsfeld named him during a Senate hearing. This led to harassment and death threats against him and his family, resulting in them being taken into protective custody by the U.S. Army.  Darby had agonized for a month beforehand, but finally decided to blow the whistle on his former friends explaining: "It violated everything I personally believed in and all I'd been taught about the rules of war." He had known Lynndie England, one of the most well-known suspects, since Basic Training. He testified that he had received the photos from Charles Graner, another soldier in the photographs.

Reactions
The disclosure was not received well by the community in which Darby and his wife, Bernadette, were living in Maryland. They have been shunned by friends and neighbors, their property has been vandalized, and they now reside in protective military custody at an undisclosed location. Bernadette said, "We did not receive the response I thought we would. People were, they were mean, saying he was a walking dead man, he was walking around with a bull's-eye on his head. It was scary."

On the other hand, CBS reports that former neighbors from one of his childhood homes in Pennsylvania were proud of him. Darby has also said that soldiers in his unit shook his hand afterward.

Recognition
On May 7, 2004, Darby was profiled as the "Person of the Week" by anchor Peter Jennings on ABC's World News Tonight, and in December 2004, he was selected as one of three ABC News "People of the Year". He was profiled and interviewed by Anderson Cooper on the December 10, 2006, broadcast of 60 Minutes (the segment was aired again on June 24, 2007).

Darby received a John F. Kennedy Profile in Courage Award on May 16, 2005, in recognition of his courage in exposing the abuses at Abu Ghraib.

Darby also received a personal letter from Donald Rumsfeld, asking him to stop talking about how his identity had been disclosed by Rumsfeld despite receiving assurances of anonymity from military command.

See also
Haditha massacre
Con Son Island prison#"Tiger cages" (Vietnam War)
Ronald Ridenhour (alerted authorities to My Lai Massacre)

References

External links
 Acceptance speech by Sergeant Joseph Darby.  2005 Profile in Courage Award, John F. Kennedy Library Foundation. 
Beliefnet.com – Most Inspiring Person of 2004
Photos and letters of support for Joseph Darby (also includes correspondence from Darby)

News clips
ABC News – Person of the Week Story  – May 7, 2004
Washington Post – When Joseph Comes Marching Home – May 16, 2004
60 Minutes – Exposing the Truth of Abu Ghraib
GQ – Prisoner of Conscience, interview of Joseph Darby
NPR – Abu Ghraib Whistleblower Speaks Out
BBC News – The Abu Ghraib whistleblower's ordeal

1979 births
Living people
Military personnel from Cumberland, Maryland
People from Somerset County, Pennsylvania
United States Army soldiers
United States military personnel at the Abu Ghraib prison
United States Army personnel of the Iraq War
American whistleblowers